William Byers (1831–1903) was a Nebraska politician.

William Byers may also refer to:
William P. Byers (born 1943), Canadian mathematician and philosopher
Billy Byers (1927–1996), American jazz trombonist and arranger

See also
Will Byers, fictional character
Bill Byers (1877–1948), baseball player
Byers, Colorado, town named for William Byers